The men's individual recurve competition at the 2013 World Archery Championships took place on 29 September – 6 October 2013 in Belek, Turkey.

146 archers from 62 countries entered the competition, with a maximum of three entries per country. The top 104 archers qualified for the knockout tournament, with the top 8 scores in qualifying receiving a bye to the third round. Reigning champion Kim Woo-jin was not selected as part of the South Korean representation. Nevertheless, for the fifth Championships in succession the title was won by a Korean, in this case 18-year-old Lee Seung-yun, who in his first season representing Korea defeated teammate, Olympic champion, World Cup champion, and world number one archer Oh Jin-hyek in the final in 5 sets.

Schedule
All times are local (UTC+02:00).

Qualification round
Pre-tournament world rankings ('WR') are taken from the 28 August 2013 World Archery Rankings. Qualification consisted of 4 rounds of 36 arrows, at 90m, 70m, 50m, and 30m. This was the last World Archery Championships in which a 30m round was used in qualification. A three-way shootoff was required to determine 7–9th places.

 Bye to third round 
 Qualified for eliminations

Elimination rounds

Top half

Section 1

Section 2

Section 3

Section 4

Bottom half

Section 5

Section 6

Section 7

Section 8

Finals

References

2013 World Archery Championships